Preobrazhenskaya is a rural locality (a stanitsa) and the administrative center of Kikvidzensky District of Volgograd Oblast, Russia. Population:

References

Notes

Sources

Rural localities in Kikvidzensky District